A monkey bridge may refer to:
 Simple suspension bridge, or rope bridge, a primitive type of bridge
 Cầu khỉ, a wood or bamboo walkway over gullies in Vietnam
 Monkey Bridge, a novel by Vietnamese-American writer Lan Cao
 Monkey bridge, the highest navigational platform on a bridge (ship)